Retrotortina is a genus of very minute sea snails, marine gastropod molluscs or micromollusks in the family Omalogyridae.

Species
Species within the genus Retrotortina include:
 Retrotortina cuniculus Barnard, 1969
 Retrotortina damara Rolán & Peñas, 2009
 Retrotortina fuscata Chaster, 1896

References

 Gofas, S.; Le Renard, J.; Bouchet, P. (2001). Mollusca, in: Costello, M.J. et al. (Ed.) (2001). European register of marine species: a check-list of the marine species in Europe and a bibliography of guides to their identification. Collection Patrimoines Naturels, 50: pp. 180–213
 Spencer, H.; Marshall. B. (2009). All Mollusca except Opisthobranchia. In: Gordon, D. (Ed.) (2009). New Zealand Inventory of Biodiversity. Volume One: Kingdom Animalia. 584 pp

External links
 Chaster G.W. (1896). Some new marine mollusca from Tangier. Journal of Malacology. 5(1): 1-4, pl. 1.
 Gofas S. & Warén A. (1998). Europe's smallest gastropod: habitat, distribution and relationships of Retrotortina fuscata (Omalogyridae). Cahiers de Biologie Marine 39: 9-14

Omalogyridae